Number 23 Gangsta Grillz is the first mixtape by the American rapper Dorrough and DJ Drama, released on February 21, 2010. It is a part of Drama's 'Gangsta Grillz' series, and is also an advertisement mixtape for Dorrough's next studio album, Get Big.

Track listing

References

External links
Livemixtapes.com

2010 mixtape albums
Dorrough albums
DJ Drama albums